Hans Hartwig von Beseler (27 April 1850 – 20 December 1921) was a German colonel general.

Biography 
Beseler was born in Greifswald, Pomerania. His father Georg Beseler, was a law professor at the University of Greifswald. He entered the Prussian Army in 1868, fought in the Franco-Prussian War of 1870-1871 and had a successful military career until his retirement in 1910. Beseler was ennobled in 1904 by William II, German Emperor.

At the outbreak of World War I in 1914 Beseler was brought out of retirement and was given command of the 3rd Reserve Corps in the German First Army led by Generaloberst Alexander von Kluck. The German army took Brussels on 20 August and the German command considered the Belgian Army defeated. The main force of the German armies marched toward France, leaving the 3rd Reserve Corps behind. Beseler was ordered to take possession of the city of Antwerp on 9 September. The Siege of Antwerp ended on 10 October, when the Antwerp Mayor Jan De Vos, surrendered the city. Beseler followed the Belgian army and was halted in the Battle of the Yser.

In the spring of 1915, Beseler was sent to the Eastern Front with Max von Gallwitz's 9th Army where he led the successful siege of Novogeorgievsk.

On 27 August 1915 Beseler was made Military Governor of the German-occupied part of the zone of Polish lands, or Congress Poland, and served as such until the end of the war. Beseler hoped to assemble three divisions of Polish volunteers for use by the Central Powers, and to this end wanted to present a "facade of independent Poland". The official title was Governor-general of Generalgouvernement Warschau. Beseler also gave his support to the Polish Border Strip plan, which would see mass expulsions of Poles and Jews from territory annexed by the German Empire from Russian-held parts of Poland, and subsequent colonization of this area by German settlers.

In November 1915 Beseler reopened the University of Warsaw and the Warsaw Polytechnic Institute and allowed the usage of Polish language at the University for the first time since 1869. Municipal councils were elected and the lower jurisdiction was organized by Polish locals. Despite these efforts, German intentions were transparent and German rule wasn't tolerated by the Poles, while German calls for Polish volunteers produced disappointing results; for the majority of Poles an Allied victory was seen as the best hope for genuine independence.

After the Act of 5th November of 1916, Beseler stayed and still wielded real power as the General Governor of the Government General of Warsaw, the 
German-occupied part of the Kingdom of Poland, alongside the Austrian Governor General , who resided in Lublin. He was also the titular commander of the so-called Polnische Wehrmacht. After the Act of 5 November was declared, he organized a ceremony in Warsaw's Royal Castle with such gestures as the unfurling of a Polish flag and the Polish national anthem being played; the event backfired as the Polish crowds started shouting "Out with the Germans!". On 4 October 1916 Beseler issued a decree allowing forced labour of Polish men aged between 18 and 45.
 
After Poland declared independence on 11 November 1918 and all German soldiers in Warsaw were disarmed, Beseler fled in disguise to Germany. A broken and disillusioned man, attacked by the German Conservatives and Nationalists as having been too liberal towards the Poles, but disliked in Poland for being too Prussian, Beseler died in 1921 in Neu-Babelsberg near Potsdam. He was buried at the Invalidenfriedhof in Berlin.

Ranks 

 1870/71: Leutnant
 1875-06-15: Oberleutnant
 1882-04-18: Hauptmann
 1888-09-19: Major
 1893-10-17: Oberstleutnant
 1897-03-22: Oberst
 1900-01-27: Generalmajor
 1903-04-18: Generalleutnant
 1907-11-09: General der Infanterie
 1918-01-27: Generaloberst

Decorations
Beseler, besides many minor decorations, received the Pour le Mérite with oak leaves and the Iron Cross (1st and 2nd Classes), and was a Commander with Star and Crown of the Prussian Order of the House of Hohenzollern.

Bibliography
Bogdan Graf von Hutten-Czapski, Sechzig Jahre Politik und Gesellschaft, Volunme 1 - 2, Berlin: Mittler 1936

References

External links 
 Kauffman, Jesse: Beseler, Hans von, in: 1914-1918-online. International Encyclopedia of the First World War.

 

 
 

Notes

1. 

1850 births
1921 deaths
People from Greifswald
People from the Province of Pomerania
Free Conservative Party politicians
Members of the Prussian House of Lords
Colonel generals of Prussia
German untitled nobility
German military personnel of the Franco-Prussian War
German Army generals of World War I
Burials at the Invalids' Cemetery
Recipients of the Pour le Mérite (military class)
Recipients of the Iron Cross (1870), 2nd class
19th-century Prussian military personnel
Military personnel from Mecklenburg-Western Pomerania